John Martin Jacobsen (born 27 December 1944) is a Norwegian film producer. He is the leader of the Norwegian production company Filmkameratene, and has produced more than 30 Norwegian movies.

Jacobsen has received several awards for his work. In 2003 he was awarded the Amanda Committee's Honorary Award. In 2008 he was appointed commander of the Order of St. Olav, for the work he has done for Norwegian film.

Jacobsen grew up in Osterhaus gate, Oslo. His mother was a stay-at-home mom, and his dad was a ship officer. He lived right next to a cinema, where he spent a lot of time. 

He started earning money by delivering newspapers, but as a 15 year old he got hired by the local cinema. The man in charge of the cinema realized that Jacobsen had an extreme interest for film, and wanted him to be in charge of setting up their film program, earning 2% of the turnover.

Filmography
 Børning 3 (2020)
Operasjon Mumie (2019)
Amundsen (2019)
Operasjon Mørkemann (2018)
Kings Bay (2017)
Børning 2 (2016)
The Lion Woman (2016)
The saboteurs (2015)
Operation Arctic (2014)
Børning (2014)
Alle barn er laget av ild (2013)
Victoria (2013)
Blekkulf (2012)
Simon & the Oaks (2011)
Elias and the Treasure of the Sea (2010)
The Troll Hunter (2010)
 Max Manus (2008)
 Elias og kongeskipet (2007)
 Izzat (2005)
 37 og et halvt (2005)
 Kvinnen i mitt liv (2003)
 Karlsson på taket (2002)
 Sleepwalker (2000)
 Sofies verden (1999)
 Only Clouds Move the Stars (1998)
 Gurin with the Foxtail (Solan, Ludvig og Gurin med reverompa) (1998)
 Head Above Water (1996)
 Jakten på nyresteinen (1996)
 De blå ulvene (1993)
 Hodet over vannet (1993)
 Giftige løgner (1992)
Haakon Haakonsen (1990)
 Pathfinder (1987)
 Hard asfalt (1986)
 Prima Veras saga om Olav den hellige (1983)

Awards

References

External links 

1944 births
Living people
Norwegian film producers